Lynton Wright Brent (August 2, 1897 – July 2, 1981) was an American film actor and a writer. He appeared in over 240 films between 1930 and 1950.

Brent is best known for his prolific work with Columbia Pictures in the Three Stooges short subjects such as A Ducking They Did Go and From Nurse to Worse.

In addition to his film career, Brent also wrote a number of literary works, notably Lesbian Gang. Though little recognized when first published in 1964, it has achieved notoriety among a niche queer audience in Peckham, England. His first novel was The Bird Cage.

Selected filmography

 Love Bound (1932)
King Kong (1933)
 The Intruder (1933)
 Mystery Mountain (1934)
 Three Little Pigskins (1934)
 Restless Knights (1935)
 Streamline Express (1935)
 Ants in the Pantry (1936)
 Half Shot Shooters (1936)
 3 Dumb Clucks (1937)
 Frontier Town (1938)
 Here's Flash Casey (1938) (unbilled)
 Mr. Wong, Detective (1938)
 It's All in Your Mind (1938)
 A Ducking They Did Go (1939)
 Yes, We Have No Bonanza (1939)
 Calling All Curs (1939)
 Nutty But Nice (1940)
 From Nurse to Worse (1940)
 Cookoo Cavaliers (1940)
 Boobs in Arms (1940)
 Forbidden Trails (1941)
 The Pioneers (1941)
 So Long Mr. Chumps (1941)
 I'll Never Heil Again (1941)
 In the Sweet Pie and Pie (1941)
 The Lone Rider in Cheyenne (1942)
 Raiders of the West (1942)
 Loco Boy Makes Good (1942)
 Man from Cheyenne (1942)
 Overland to Deadwood (1942)
 Trail Riders (1942)
 Dizzy Detectives (1943)
 The Utah Kid (1944)
 Gents Without Cents (1944)
 Valley of Vengeance (1944)
 Micro-Phonies (1945)
 Beer Barrel Polecats (1946)
Drifting Along  (1946)

References

External links

1897 births
1981 deaths
American male film actors
20th-century American male actors